Arenibacterium arenosum is a Gram-negative, aerobic, rod-shaped and non-motile  bacterium from the genus of Arenibacterium which has been isolated from sand from the coast of Korea.

References 

Rhodobacteraceae
Bacteria described in 2022